Memorial is the debut album of the Israeli oriental death/doom metal band Distorted, released in 2006.

Track listing

Release history

2006 debut albums
Distorted albums